Naranbulag  is a sum (district) of Uvs Province in western Mongolia.

External links 
 Official site

Populated places in Mongolia
Districts of Uvs Province